In geometry, the alternated order-4 hexagonal tiling is a uniform tiling of the hyperbolic plane. It has Schläfli symbol of (3,4,4), h{6,4}, and hr{6,6}.

Uniform constructions 
There are four uniform constructions, with some of lower ones which can be seen with two colors of triangles:

Related polyhedra and tiling

References
 John H. Conway, Heidi Burgiel, Chaim Goodman-Strass, The Symmetries of Things 2008,  (Chapter 19, The Hyperbolic Archimedean Tessellations)

See also

Square tiling
Uniform tilings in hyperbolic plane
List of regular polytopes

External links 

 Hyperbolic and Spherical Tiling Gallery
 KaleidoTile 3: Educational software to create spherical, planar and hyperbolic tilings
 Hyperbolic Planar Tessellations, Don Hatch

Hexagonal tilings
Hyperbolic tilings
Isogonal tilings
Order-4 tilings
Semiregular tilings